Oakfield Park School (formerly OakTree School) is a coeducational special school in Ackworth, West Yorkshire, England.

In early 2000s Oakfield Tree School was renamed into Oakfield Park School

On 5 September 2017 new classrooms were opened, and to communicate with new and ongoing students (though kept a ongoing students) a Blu-ray Disc system was installed in some classrooms.

The village planned to open an Ackworth FM studio and launch the station by 2019 next to the Oakfield Park School on the left side of the tennis court. This failed due to the station going into administration, and the station license was not awarded by Ofcom. The building was demolished.

New building
In late-2014 work on the New Building had begun. The new building was completed, and a new logo was introduced in summer 2015. Jumpers and T-shirts for students were redesigned accordingly.

Mobile phones ban
In February 2019, The school banned the use of mobile phones in school because of the calling too hard, noise and other expensive calls.

App
In May 2019 Oakfield Park School launched a new app called SchoolJotter which is available for Android and iOS devices.

Productions
The Good Old Days/The Days Gone By
The Jungle Book Show featuring Survivor and more.
Om Nom Party (upcoming event)

References 

Special schools in the City of Wakefield
Community schools in the City of Wakefield
Special secondary schools in England